This is a list of novels set in Shanghai, China.

The Blue Lotus by Hergé
Chang Kai and the House of Hong by Robert de Vries
A Circle Has No End by Tony Henderson
China frisst Menschen by Richard Huelsenbeek (in German)
China Rich Girlfriend  by Kevin Kwan 
The Concubine of Shanghai by Hong Ying
The Corps Book One  by W.E.B. Griffin
Death of a Red Heroine by Qiu Xiaolong
The Diamond Age by Neal Stephenson
Distant Land of My Father by Bo Caldwell
Empire of the Sun by J. G. Ballard
Five Star Billionnaire by Tash Aw
Fist of the Blue Sky, by Tetsuo Hara, Buronson
The House of Memory - A Novel of Shanghai  by Nicholas R. Clifford
The Immortals: a Novel of Shanghai by Natasha Peters
El judío de Shanghai by Emilio Calderón
Kaufherr von Shanghai by Norbert Jacques (in German)
Love and Other Moods by Crystal Z. LeeA Loyal Character Dancer by Qiu XiaolongLove in a Fallen City, a collection of short-stories by Eileen Chang, Karen S. Kingsbury translatorMan's Fate by Andre MalrauxThe Master of Rain by Tom BradbyMidnight by Mao DunThe Painter of Shanghai by Jennifer Cody EpsteinThe Patriot by Pearl S. BuckSchanghai by Sergei Alymow (in German)Schüsse in Schanghai by Alfred Schirokauer (in German)Shanghai by Christopher NewShanghai by William Leonard MarshallShanghai: a novel by Yokomitsu Riichi (translated with a postscript by Dennis Washburn)Shanghai Baby: A Novel by Wei HuiShanghai Dancing by Brian CastroThese Violent Delights by Chloe GongThe Shanghai Factor by Charles McCarryShanghai Foxtrot by Mu Shiying (translated by Sean Macdonald)Shanghai Girls by Lisa SeeShanghai hotel by Vicki BaumShanghai Kiss by Kern Konwiser and David RenShanghai Scarlet, a historical novel 1920s – 1940s by Margaret BlairShanghai Tango by William OvergardShanghai 66 by Jon ClayShibumi by TrevanianSong of the Exile by Kiana DavenportThe Shanghai Bund Murders by Frabcus Van Wyck MasonThe Sing-song Girls of Shanghai by Han Bangqing (translated by Eileen Chang)The Song of Everlasting Sorrow by Wang AnyiThat Summer in ShanghaI by Bob de VriesWhen We Were Orphans by Kazuo IshiguroWhite Shanghai. A Novel of the Roaring Twenties in China'' by Elvira Baryakina

See also
List of films set in Shanghai

References

Lists of books
Fiction
Fiction